Target: The Final Mission is a 2010 Indian Bengali-language film directed by Raja Chanda, starring Joy Kumar Mukherjee and Sayantika, and Mithun Chakraborty in a special appearance.

Summary
Target: The Final Mission is the story Suvankar, an upright police officer whose daredevilry is obstructed by a Sadhu, a criminal in disguise, but Anthony, a man with a mission arrives to protect Suvankar.

Cast 
 Mithun Chakraborty - Advocate Anthony D'Suza, Shankar's adopted son
 Joy Kumar Mukherjee - Subhankar Sanyal, police officer
 Sayantika Banerjee - Priti, Subhankar's love interest 
 Deepankar De as Giridhari Ananda, the dreaded gangster of Sundargarh
 Santu Mukhopadhyay - Shankar Sanyal, Subhankar's father
 Biswajit Chakraborty as Police Commissioner Tanmay Nondi
 Sonali Chowdhury
 Neel Mukherjee as Rupankar Sanyal, Subhankar's elder brother
 Prasun Gain as Pappu Modak 
 Shyamal Dutta as Abani Ghosh, Priti's father
 Manjil Banerjee as Munna, Constable
 Nachiketa Chakraborty as the singer in the song 'Chena Shona Prithibita' (cameo)

Music

References

External links 
 

Bengali-language Indian films
2010 films
2010s Bengali-language films
Films directed by Raja Chanda
Films scored by Jeet Ganguly